Private Schulz is a 1981 BBC television comedy drama serial set mostly in Germany, during and immediately after World War II. It stars Michael Elphick in the title role and Ian Richardson playing various parts. Other notable actors included Tony Caunter, Billie Whitelaw, Billy Murray and Mark Wingett. It was shown on Masterpiece Theatre in the US.

Plot summary
Over six 50-minute episodes, it tells the story of Gerhard Schulz, a German fraudster and petty criminal who is forced against his will to serve in the SS. In a story based on the real, though unrealised, plot by the Germans known as Operation Bernhard, he persuades his superiors to authorise a project to print counterfeit British five pound notes for the purpose of destroying the British economy. Schulz has little interest in the defeat of Britain, and simply wants to steal the forged notes, although he is also strongly motivated to help a former criminal colleague, a Jewish master forger imprisoned in a concentration camp. Other elements of the story based on the history of the period, include the Venlo incident, when two British intelligence officers were abducted from the Netherlands at the start of the war. Salon Kitty was a Berlin brothel, secretly run by the Sicherheitsdienst (the intelligence agency of the SS) to spy on its clientele, who were often prominent German government officials or military officers.

Production
Many of the main characters are based on real people (though some of the characters carry different names). Dialogue in the series is in English and in situations where Schulz interacts with English characters, his delivery is deliberate, like that of a non-native speaker not used to speaking English, or attempting to conceal his native accent. Billie Whitelaw played the role of a prostitute working at Salon Kitty, where German officers were secretly recorded by the SS. Her character claims to have a psychological block that prevents her having sex with any soldier below the rank of major. The screenplay was by Jack Pulman, who died in 1979 before any filming had taken place. In 1982, he was posthumously awarded a writer's award by The Royal Television Society for his work on Private Schulz. Other notable names involved in the show include composer Carl Davis and producer Philip Hinchcliffe.

Cast
 Private Gerhard Schulz – Michael Elphick
 Major Neuheim, Gerald Melfort, Stanley Kemp – Ian Richardson
 Bertha Freya – Billie Whitelaw
 Gertrude Steiner – Rula Lenska
 Iphraim "Solly" Solikoff – Cyril Shaps
 Schumacher – Terence Suffolk
 Professor Bodelschwingh – David Swift
 Herr Krauss – Ken Campbell

Episodes

Reception
Michael Elphick's performance was praised in a 1983 review in The New York Times and noted the script by the late Jack Pulman "manages to be almost wickedly clever as it hones in on the foibles of not only the Germans but also of the British."

Novelization

Concurrent with the airing of the miniseries, New English Library issued a prose adaptation of Pulman's scripts by career novelizer Martin Noble, under the title Jack Pulman's Private Schulz, with Noble by-lined on the title page, but not the cover. An unusually expansive and stylish adaptation, it contains additional plot twists, characters and historical context; notes left by Pulman indicate that the latter was especially important to him: he thought it vital to particularize the backdrop against which the outlandish forgery scheme (based on actual events) could have been conceived and carried out. It would have figured into his own novelization, but he had completed only a few chapters before he died. The original edition of Noble's novel was very well received and became a London Times bestseller. In 2015, Noble, through his own publishing company, Aesop Modern, released a newly revised and expanded edition of the novelization, this time with his novelist by-line prominently displayed on the front, in hardcover, trade paperback and ebook format. It remains in print.

References

External links
 Classic 80's TV – Private Schulz
 BBC4 page on Private Schulz
 Operation Bernard – Background Information 
 

British television miniseries
1980s British drama television series
English-language television shows
BBC television dramas
World War II television drama series